The arrondissement of Largentière is an arrondissement of France in the Ardèche department in the Auvergne-Rhône-Alpes region. It has 151 communes.

Composition

The communes of the arrondissement of Largentière are:

Ailhon
Aizac
Les Assions
Astet
Aubenas
Balazuc
Banne
Barnas
Le Béage
Beaulieu
Beaumont
Berrias-et-Casteljau
Berzème
Bessas
Borée
Borne
Burzet
Cellier-du-Luc
Chambonas
Chandolas
Chassiers
Chauzon
Chazeaux
Chirols
Coucouron
Cros-de-Géorand
Darbres
Dompnac
Fabras
Faugères
Fons
Genestelle
Gravières
Grospierres
Issanlas
Issarlès
Jaujac
Joannas
Joyeuse
Juvinas
Labastide-de-Virac
Labastide-sur-Bésorgues
Labeaume
Labégude
Lablachère
Laboule
Le Lac-d'Issarlès
Lachamp-Raphaël
Lachapelle-Graillouse
Lachapelle-sous-Aubenas
Lagorce
Lalevade-d'Ardèche
Lanarce
Lanas
Largentière
Laurac-en-Vivarais
Laveyrune
Lavillatte
Lavilledieu
Laviolle
Lentillères
Lespéron
Loubaresse
Lussas
Malarce-sur-la-Thines
Malbosc
Mayres
Mazan-l'Abbaye
Mercuer
Meyras
Mézilhac
Mirabel
Montpezat-sous-Bauzon
Montréal
Montselgues
Orgnac-l'Aven
Payzac
Péreyres
Le Plagnal
Planzolles
Pont-de-Labeaume
Prades
Pradons
Prunet
Ribes
Rochecolombe
Rocher
La Rochette
Rocles
Rosières
Le Roux
Ruoms
Sablières
Sagnes-et-Goudoulet
Saint-Alban-Auriolles
Saint-Alban-en-Montagne
Saint-Andéol-de-Berg
Saint-Andéol-de-Vals
Saint-André-de-Cruzières
Saint-André-Lachamp
Saint-Cirgues-de-Prades
Saint-Cirgues-en-Montagne
Saint-Didier-sous-Aubenas
Sainte-Eulalie
Sainte-Marguerite-Lafigère
Saint-Étienne-de-Boulogne
Saint-Étienne-de-Fontbellon
Saint-Étienne-de-Lugdarès
Saint-Genest-de-Beauzon
Saint-Germain
Saint-Gineys-en-Coiron
Saint-Jean-le-Centenier
Saint-Joseph-des-Bancs
Saint-Julien-du-Serre
Saint-Laurent-les-Bains-Laval-d'Aurelle
Saint-Laurent-sous-Coiron
Saint-Martial
Saint-Maurice-d'Ardèche
Saint-Maurice-d'Ibie
Saint-Mélany
Saint-Michel-de-Boulogne
Saint-Paul-le-Jeune
Saint-Pierre-de-Colombier
Saint-Pierre-Saint-Jean
Saint-Pons
Saint-Privat
Saint-Remèze
Saint-Sauveur-de-Cruzières
Saint-Sernin
Salavas
Les Salelles
Sampzon
Sanilhac
Sceautres
La Souche
Tauriers
Thueyts
Ucel
Usclades-et-Rieutord
Uzer
Vagnas
Valgorge
Vallées-d'Antraigues-Asperjoc
Vallon-Pont-d'Arc
Vals-les-Bains
Les Vans
Vernon
Vesseaux
Villeneuve-de-Berg
Vinezac
Vogüé

History

The arrondissement of Largentière was created in 1800. In 2007 it was expanded with the four cantons of Antraigues-sur-Volane, Aubenas, Vals-les-Bains and Villeneuve-de-Berg from the arrondissement of Privas. At the January 2017 reorganization of the arrondissements of Ardèche, it gained two communes from the arrondissement of Privas and three communes from the arrondissement of Tournon-sur-Rhône.

As a result of the reorganisation of the cantons of France which came into effect in 2015, the borders of the cantons are no longer related to the borders of the arrondissements. The cantons of the arrondissement of Largentière were, as of January 2015:

 Antraigues-sur-Volane
 Aubenas
 Burzet
 Coucouron
 Joyeuse
 Largentière
 Montpezat-sous-Bauzon
 Saint-Étienne-de-Lugdarès
 Thueyts
 Valgorge
 Vallon-Pont-d'Arc
 Vals-les-Bains
 Les Vans
 Villeneuve-de-Berg

References

Largentiere